"Low Blows" is a song recorded by Australian singer Meg Mac. The song was released on 31 March 2017 as the lead single from Mac's debut studio album of the same name. The song was certified platinum in Australia in 2019.

The song was voted in at number 30 on the Triple J Hottest 100, 2017.

Upon release of the album, Mac told V Magazine she wrote the song in her room in Melbourne, saying "I didn't plan on 'Low Blows' being the [lead] single, but whenever people listened to it they thought that it should be. 'Low Blows' is really about looking back and knowing that things would be different if I stood up for myself. It's almost a little bit sad watching yourself and how things could be different."

Music video
The music video for "Low Blows" shows Mac in the Niles City Sound studio in Texas, recording the Low Blows album. The video was released on 20 March 2017.

Certifications

References

2017 songs
2017 singles
Meg Mac songs